In ancient Greek mythology, Rhodopis and Euthynicus are two sworn hunters who incurred the wrath of Aphrodite, the goddess of love and beauty. Their myth is attested in two late sources; Leucippe and Clitophon, a Greek second century AD romance novel by Achilles Tatius, and the Byzantine Drosilla and Charikles novel by Niketas Eugenianos, written in the twelfth century.

Mythology 
Rhodopis was a beautiful maiden who kept her hair short and loved to hunt in the forests. Artemis, the maiden goddess of the hunt, took notice of her, and invited Rhodopis to join her in the chase, and thus the young girl shunned marriage as well as all kinds of romantic love. Aphrodite, the goddess of love, overheard Rhodopis swearing her oath of chastity to the goddess and was immediately infuriated. Similarly, the young Euthynicus of Ephesus was another deeply devoted hunter who was averse to all delights of romance just like Rhodopis.

One day that Artemis was not around, Aphrodite contrived to make the game they were playing run in the same direction, and after convincing her bow-bearing son Eros that Rhodopis and Euthynicus's chaste lifestyle was a grave insult to both him and her as deities of love, commanded him to strike them both with his love-inducing arrows. Eros did as told, and the two hunters immediately fell in love with one another. They withdrew to a cavern and there they broke their chastity vows. Artemis then saw Aphrodite laughing, and understood what had happened, so she turned Rhodopis into a fountain right on the spot where she had lost her virginity. For that reason, any young woman suspected of impurity was made to step into the fountain thereafter, as a testing place. Euthynicus' own fate is not touched upon.

A character from the novel, Melite, is subjected to such a test. Melite and Clitophon, in spite of their vows of faithfulness to their respective partners, surrender to their urges and lie with each other. In a sense, Aphrodite and Rhodopis hide Melite's, an adulteress, affair under the waters of the spring, in a similar rite in which a sympathetic adulteress is judged innocent.

Interpretation of the myth 
This myth of a sworn companion to Artemis breaking their vow is similar to the myth of Callisto, while Aphrodite's ire and revenge due to their rejection of love parallels the story of Hippolytus, whose central theme is the antagonism between Aphrodite and Artemis and the mutually-excluding domains they represent. There have been some hypotheses that the myths about Artemis's (female) companions breaking their vows were originally about Artemis herself, before her characterization shifted to that of a forever maiden who fiercely defends her virginity.

The myth has no known antecedent in surviving ancient Greek literature, however in a calyx-crater from circa 340-330 BC attributed to the Darius Painter Rhodopis is identified (as Rhodope) among several other figures, among them the intimidating presence of Artemis and Aphrodite, and even Hippolytus. The calyx-crater seems to attest a variant of the myth above in which Rhodope is called to prove her sexual innocence before a king named Scythes. This otherwise unknown narrative could perhaps be sourced from a fourth-century tragedy that has been lost.

The element of the spring Rhodopis was transformed into being used as a testing place of sexual innocence has similarities with another ancient myth Tatius recorded, that of Syrinx. In the standard tale, Syrinx is a nymph who ran away from the amorous advances of Pan, the god of the countryside. Syrinx transformed into reeds in order to escape him, and Pan used the newly-formed plant to create his panpipes, his defining musical instrument. Tatius adds that Pan left some panpipes in a cave that will sound a melody if a maiden passes her virginity test.

See also 

 Hippolytus of Athens
 Polyphonte
 Callisto
 Titanis
 Echemeia

Footnotes

References

Bibliography 
 
 
 
 
 
 
  Online version at Perseus.tufts project.
 
 
 
 
 
 

Deeds of Artemis
Deeds of Aphrodite
Metamorphoses into bodies of water in Greek mythology
Retinue of Artemis
Mythological hunters
Deeds of Eros
Mythological lovers
Anatolian characters in Greek mythology